Wynn Roberts (born 1923/1924 – 24 August 2021) credited also as Wyn Roberts and Wynne Roberts,  was an Australian radio, stage and screen actor who appeared in more than 70 film and television productions between the early 1950s and 2001. He appeared in numerous TV plays and also featured in TV miniseries over a career spanning 50 years.
 
His television credits include Homicide, Prisoner, Special Squad, Neighbours, The Flying Doctors, Police Rescue, A Country Practice and Wildside. He is also known for his role as Sergeant Bumpher in the 1975 film classic Picnic at Hanging Rock. He was also a leading stage actor, starting from the late 1940s.

He worked for a number of years in radio.

A 1965 article called him "one of the best and most versatile actors left in Australia - probably the best in Melbourne".
 
He died on 24 August 2021 in Tanja, New South Wales, aged 97.

Filmography (selected credits)

References

External links
 
 

1920s births
2021 deaths
Australian male film actors
Australian male soap opera actors
20th-century Australian male actors
21st-century Australian male actors
Year of birth missing